Gloriosa superba is a species of flowering plant in the family Colchicaceae. Common names include flame lily, climbing lily, creeping lily, glory lily, gloriosa lily, tiger claw, agnishikha and fire lily.

Description

This herbaceous perennial grows from a fleshy rhizome. The leaves are mainly alternately arranged, but they may be opposite, as well. They are generally bright red to orange at maturity, sometimes with yellowish bases. The margins may be quite wavy.

Cultivars of this popular garden plant may vary from these wild-type characteristics; the cultivar 'Lutea' has all-yellow tepals, 'Citrina' is yellow with red markings, and 'Nana' is a dwarf. Whitish forms are also known.

Ecology

The plant likely is pollinated by butterflies and sunbirds. It grows in many types of habitat, including tropical jungles, forests, thickets, woodlands, grasslands, and sand dunes. It can grow in nutrient-poor soils.

Toxicity

This plant is poisonous, toxic enough to cause human and animal fatalities if ingested. It has been used to commit murder, to achieve suicide, and to kill animals. Every part of the plant is poisonous, especially the tuberous rhizomes. As with other members of the Colchicaceae, this plant contains high levels of colchicine, a toxic alkaloid. It also contains the alkaloid gloriocine. Within a few hours of the ingestion of a toxic amount of plant material, a victim may experience nausea, vomiting, numbness, and tingling around the mouth, burning in the throat, abdominal pain, and bloody diarrhea, which leads to dehydration. As the toxic syndrome progresses, rhabdomyolysis, ileus, respiratory depression, hypotension, coagulopathy, haematuria, altered mental status, seizures, coma, and ascending polyneuropathy may occur. Longer-term effects include peeling of the skin and prolonged vaginal bleeding in women. Colchicine is known to cause alopecia. One case report described a patient who accidentally ate the tubers and then experienced hair loss over her entire body, including complete baldness. Poisonings can occur when the tubers are mistaken for sweet potatoes or yams and eaten. The plant can be dangerous for cats, dogs, horses, and livestock, as well.

Human uses
The alkaloid-rich plant has long been used as a traditional medicine in many cultures. It has been used in the treatment of gout, infertility, open wounds, snakebite, ulcers, arthritis, cholera, colic, kidney problems, typhus, itching, leprosy, bruises, sprains, hemorrhoids, cancer, impotence, nocturnal emission, smallpox, sexually transmitted diseases, and many types of internal parasites. It is an anthelmintic. It has been used as a laxative and an alexiteric. The sap is used to treat acne and head lice. In a pregnant woman, it may cause abortion. In parts of India, extracts of the rhizome are applied topically during childbirth to reduce labor pain.

Other uses for this plant include arrow poison in Nigeria and snake repellent in India. Some cultures consider it to be magical. The flowers are part of religious rituals.

This species is the national flower of Zimbabwe. In 1947, Queen Elizabeth II received a diamond brooch in the shape of this flower for her twenty-first birthday while traveling in Rhodesia, now called Zimbabwe.

In Tamil, this flower is commonly known as Karthigaipoo (கார்த்திகைப்பூ) because it grows during the Tamil month of Karthigai (November–December). It is the state flower of Tamil Nadu state in India. It was also designated as the national flower of the de facto state of Tamil Eelam by the Liberation Tigers of Tamil Eelam (LTTE), because it contains all the colours contained in the Tamil Eelam national flag and because it grows during November, coinciding with Maaveerar Naal.

In cultivation

The plant can be propagated sexually by seed or vegetatively by dividing the rhizome. Problems during cultivation include inadequate pollination, fungal diseases such as leaf blight and tuber rot, and crop pests such as the moths Polytela gloriosa and Chrysodeixis chalcites. It is also a crop that is slow to propagate; each split tuber produces only one extra plant in a year's time. In vitro experiments with plant tissue culture have been performed, and some increased the yield.

Both the fruit and the rhizome are harvested. The fruits are dried and split, and the seeds are removed and dried further. The seeds and rhizomes are sold whole, as powder, or as oil extracts.

Conservation and invasion
In general, this plant is common in the wild. It is in great demand for medicinal use, so it is cultivated on farms in India, but most plant material sold into the pharmaceutical trade comes from wild populations. This is one reason for its decline in parts of its native range. In Sri Lanka it has become rare, and in Orissa it is thought to be nearing extinction. On the other hand, it has been introduced outside its native range and has become a weed which may be invasive. In Australia, for example, it now can be found growing in coastal areas of Queensland and New South Wales. It also is cited as an invasive species in the Cook Islands, French Polynesia, Kiribati, and Singapore.

References

External links

 

Colchicaceae
Medicinal plants
Garden plants
National symbols of Rhodesia
National symbols of Zimbabwe
Plants described in 1753
Taxa named by Carl Linnaeus
Poisonous plants